Lily Conrad, Marchesa Theodoli ( – ) was an American-Italian novelist.  

After her father's death, she and her mother relocated to Rome, where her mother married the Marchese Francesco Cavalletti. Lily Conrad was educated at the Sacro Cuore della Trinità dei Monti.

In Rome, as a young woman Lily Conrad was pursued by many would-be suitors, including the novelist Frances Marion Crawford.  One of those would-be suitors reportedly committed suicide by shooting himself in front of a portrait of her.  In 1874, Conrad married the Marchese Alfonso Theodoli (1845–1910).   They had two sons.

Lily Theodoli died in 1908 in Rome.

Bibliography 

 Under Pressure: Scenes from Roman Life.  2 vol.  London: Macmillan, 1892.
 Candiduccia: Scenes from Roman Life.  2 vol.  London: Kegan Paul, 1894.

References 

Created via preloaddraft
1850 births
1908 deaths
American women novelists
Italian women novelists
Writers from New Orleans